Golden State was a 3-masted schooner built in the W.F. Stone yard in Oakland, California in 1913.

She embarked on a fishing expedition from San Francisco to the Bering Sea in 1936.

Golden State was laid up in Long Beach, California, in 1937 after being used in movies. She was sold in Costa Rica in 1943.

Earlier 19th century schooner
The schooner "'Golden State,' of San Francisco" was involved in the 1858 lawsuit Wetherbee vs. Schooner "Golden State" (and Captain W. S. Tuttle).

References

Schooners of the United States
Individual sailing vessels
Ships built in Oakland, California
1913 ships